Hymenocallis liriosme is a North American bulb-forming herb native to Texas, Louisiana, Oklahoma, Arkansas, Mississippi and Alabama.

Hymenocallis liriosme grows in ditches and along the edges of marshes, swamps and ponds. Common names include Texas spider-lily, western marsh spider-lily, Louisiana marsh spider-lily and spring spiderlily. It is distinguished by a prominent yellow-green eye in the center of the corona.

References

liriosme
Flora of the Southern United States
Plants described in 1817